Baegyangsa, also spelled Baekyangsa, is a head temple of the Jogye Order of Korean Buddhism.  It is situated in Bukha-myeon, Jangseong County, in South Jeolla province, South Korea.  Built in 632 under the Baekje kingdom, it lies on the slopes of Baegam-san in Naejangsan National Park.

History
Baegyangsa was established by Zen Master Yeohwan in 632 AD. The temple's original name was Baegamsa. In the Goryeo Dynasty, it was called Jeongtosa. In Korean, Jeongto is the same concept of heaven as in Christianity. The name of the temple means "white sheep," and refers to a legend from the Goryeo period in which a white sheep came down from the mountain to listen to a sermon and was sufficiently enlightened that it was able to ascend into Paradise.

In the Japanese occupation era the temple was recognized as one of the main temples in the Korean peninsula. It belongs to the Chogye Order at the present time. These days, a large role has been given to Baegyang Temple for educating monks around Jeolla province.

The temple has recently become well-known as the home of monk and chef Jeong Kwan.

Forests 
Large numbers of Torreya nucifera grow around Baegyang Temple. This area is one of the northernmost areas where Torreya nucifera can grow in the Korean peninsula.

Tourism 
The temple is a notable tourist destination, offering a Temple Stay program. The Temple Stay offers a shorter program and an overnight program, in which participants can learn cooking with Jeong Kwan.

Transportation 
Baegyangsa is serviced by intercity buses, with several buses per day to the main bus terminals in Jeongeup and Gwangju.

See also
Jeong Kwan
Buddhist temples in South Korea
Religion in South Korea

References

External links
Official site, in Korean
Official Temple Stay site
Photo gallery by Sean Coutts
KoreaTemple profile

Religious organizations established in the 7th century
Jangseong County
Buddhist temples in South Korea
7th-century Buddhist temples
Buddhist temples of the Jogye Order
Buildings and structures in South Jeolla Province
Religious buildings and structures completed in 632